is a town located in Mikata District, Hyōgo Prefecture, Japan. , the town had an estimated population of 12,814 in 4873 households and a population density of 53 persons per km².

Geography 
Shin'onsen is located in the north westernmost part of Hyōgo Prefecture and the Kinki region. It borders Tottori Prefecture in the west and faces the Sea of Japan in the north. It lies entirely within the San'in Kaigan Geopark. In addition, the mountainous area in the south is within the borders of the Hyōnosen-Ushiroyama-Nagisan Quasi-National Park and the Tajima Mountain Prefectural Natural Park. The Tajima Mihonoura coast is designated as a National Places of Scenic Beauty and a Natural Monument. The town spreads around the coast and rivers of the Kishida River system, and in the mountainous area in the south, there is Yumura Onsen. The area is part of the snow country and is characterized by heavy accumulations of snow in winter.

Neighbouring municipalities 
Hyōgo Prefecture
 Kami
Tottori Prefecture
 Iwami
 Tottori
 Wakasa

Climate
Shin'onsen has a Humid subtropical climate (Köppen Cfa) characterized by warm summers and cold winters with heavy snowfall.  The average annual temperature in Shin'onsen is 12.2 °C. The average annual rainfall is 1841 mm with September as the wettest month. The temperatures are highest on average in August, at around 24.0 °C, and lowest in January, at around 0.8 °C.

Demographics
Per Japanese census data, the population of Shin'onsen peaked in the 1950s, and has been declining since.

History
The area of the modern town of Shin'onsen was within ancient Tajima Province, and corresponds almost directly to the area of ancient Futakata District.  In the Edo Period, it was divided between an area was controlled by Toyooka Domain, and by tenryo territory under direct administration of the Tokugawa shogunate. Following the Meiji restoration, the villages of  Onsen  and Nishihama and were established within Mikata District with the creation of the modern municipalities system on April 1, 1889.  On December 11, 1891 Nishihama was raised to town status and renamed Hamasaka. On October 1, 2005, Onsen and Hamasaka merger to form the town of Shin'onsen.

Government
Shin'onsen has a mayor-council form of government with a directly elected mayor and a unicameral town council of 16 members. Shin'onsen, together with the town of Kami contributes one member to the Hyogo Prefectural Assembly. In terms of national politics, the town is part of Hyōgo 5th district of the lower house of the Diet of Japan.

Economy
Shin'onsen has a mixed economy of commercial fishing, agriculture and tourism. The town is known for its hot spring resorts and also for the production of "Tajima beef".

Education
Shin'onsen has six public elementary schools and two public middle schools operated by the town government and one public high school operated by the Hyōgo Prefectural Department of Education.

Transportation

Railway
 JR West – San'in Main Line
  -  -  -

Highway

Local attractions
 Antai-ji Zen monastery
 Yumura Onsen (Hyogo)
 San'in Kaigan Geopark

References

External links

Shin'onsen official website 
 Website of Antaiji, an international Zen monastery located in Shinonsen (English, Japanese and German)
 Website of San'in Kaigan Geopark Center located in Shinonsen, with much information on the Geopark and other facilities in town (English and Japanese)

Towns in Hyōgo Prefecture
Populated coastal places in Japan
Shin'onsen, Hyōgo